The Vienna Cup was a football competition held in Vienna, Austria and organized by Vienna Football Club in 1914. It was only played once due to the outbreak of World War I, and won by Glentoran.

Glentoran, as winners of the Irish Cup in 1914, embarked on a tour of Central Europe in May and June of that year. After losing 4–3 to Deutsche on 21 May, they defeated Hertha Berlin 4–1 on 23 May, before a 1–1 draw with a Vienna Select XI on 27 May. A second match was played against the Vienna Select XI side on 30 May which Glentoran won 5–0. The 30 May match was played for the Vienna Cup. Glentoran played two further times on their tour, following up the Vienna Cup win with a 3–0 victory against Pressburg on 31 May before losing 7–0 against a Hungarian XI on 1 June.

FA Cup winners, Burnley and Scottish Cup winners, Celtic also participated in concurrent European tours, including a game against each other in Budapest on 21 May for the similarly titled Budapest Cup. The match ended in a 1–1 draw, with a replay at Turf Moor won 2–1 by Celtic on 1 September. Neither side faced Glentoran during their tours.

References

Sources
   www.glentoran-fc.co.uk 
 
 

Austrian football friendly trophies
1913–14 in European football
Glentoran F.C.
1914 establishments in Austria